William Lowery (1885–1941) was an American silent film actor.

Bill Lowery may also refer to:

Bill Lowery (politician) (born 1947), U.S. Republican politician from California
Bill Lowery (record producer) (1924–2004), American music entrepreneur

See also
William Lowrie (1857–1933), Australian agricultural educationist
William Lowry (1884–1949), Northern Irish barrister, judge, Member of Parliament, and Attorney General for Northern Ireland